Guru.com is a freelance marketplace. It allows companies to find freelance workers for commissioned work. Founded in 1998 and headquartered in Pittsburgh, Guru was initially known as eMoonlighter.com.

History
Guru Inc. was founded in 1999 in San Francisco as an online clearing house for high tech workers seeking short-term contracts. The company, led by brothers Jon and James Slavet, raised $3M in angel funding and a further $16M in a full venture round led by Greylock Partners and August Capital. In a May 2000 interview, Paul Saffo cited Guru.com as an example of a company using the Internet to provide new kinds of services where individuals negotiated directly with potential employers.

The company was acquired in December 2002 by Unicru, a human resources software company based in Portland, Oregon. Guru's technology and staff remained with Unicru. Guru has overall, received an approximate of $41 million in funding.

In June 2003, small business consulting and creative design firm eMoonlighter bought Guru.com through the leadership of chief executive officer Inderpal Guglani, who subsequently became CEO of Guru. In February 2004, eMoonlighter officially changed its name to Guru.com. The acquisition, which brought along several clients now relying on Guru for freelancing needs, boosted eMoonlighter's reputation of only offering the services of “moonlighting” freelancers to one of full-time, reliable freelance workers able to meet the needs of any company–which has become what Guru is known for today.

How Guru Works 
Guru connects employers and freelancers securely and flexibly online. Employers post job descriptions, including payment offered. Freelancers post profiles highlighting their skills and services. Employers can search for and invite specific freelancers to submit quotes for jobs, and freelancers who are interested in jobs can submit bids. Employers review the quotes received along with freelancers’ profiles, portfolios, feedback reviews, and earnings statistics and select freelancers to hire. Employers and freelancers form an agreement on the scope of work, payment terms, and timeline.

Guru's WorkRoom feature allows employers to manage one or more freelancers, assign roles, and keep interactions, time tracking, and payments in one place.

Guru's SafePay payment system ensures secure payment for employers and freelancers. Employers and freelancers choose from various payment methods. Employers can deposit funds so freelancers see that funds are available before starting work, and employers release funds after reviewing the work.
 
Guru currently claims to have around three million online users, with nearly one million visits to the site each month.

Merger & Present day
Unicru sold the Guru.com domain name and logo to eMoonlighter.com, and eMoonlighter was renamed Guru.com.

See also

Upwork
Fiverr
Freelancer.com
PeoplePerHour

References

External links
Official Website

Online marketplaces of the United States
Business services companies established in 1998
Internet properties established in 1998
Freelance marketplace websites
Employment websites in the United States
Companies based in Pittsburgh
1998 establishments in Pennsylvania